Classics is a duet album by Kenny Rogers and Dottie West, released in 1979.

This album was Kenny Rogers' and Dottie West's second album together. Their previous album, Every Time Two Fools Collide, was a major seller, and made them one of the biggest duet acts country music has ever seen. This album was no different. The album sold very well, and peaked at number three on the Top Country Albums chart in 1979, and No.82 on the Billboard 200. This album featured cover versions of classic hits by other artists, including two country hit singles, one went to number one, called "All I Ever Need Is You" (a big hit for Sonny and Cher), and another went to number three, called "'Til I Can Make It on My Own" (a hit for Tammy Wynette).

The album was certified by the RIAA as Platinum. It has sold over 2 million copies worldwide.

Track listing

Personnel 
Kenny Rogers - vocals
Dottie West - guitar, vocals
Tommy Allsup – bass
Byron Bach – strings
George Binkley III – strings
Larry Butler – harpsichord, keyboards, producer
Jimmy Capps – guitar
Jerry Carrigan – percussion, drums
John Catchings – strings
Marvin Chantry – strings
Gene Chrisman – percussion, drums
Roy Christensen – strings
Bobby Daniels – backing vocals 
Randy Dorman – guitar
Pete Drake – steel guitar
Ray Edenton – guitar
Steve Glassmeyer – soprano saxophone, backing vocals 
Gene Golden – backing vocals 
Carl Gorodetzky – strings
Lennie Haight – strings
The Jordanaires – backing vocals 
Bill Justis – strings, string arrangements
Sheldon Kurland – strings
Byron Metcalf – percussion, drums
Bob Moore – bass
Hargus "Pig" Robbins – keyboards
Billy Sanford – guitar
Billy Sherrill – engineer
Steven Maxwell Smith – strings
Gary VanOsdale – strings
Pamela VanOsdale – strings
Chip Young – guitar
Reggie Young – guitar

Charts
Album – Billboard (United States)

Singles – Billboard (United States)

1979 albums
Dottie West albums
Kenny Rogers albums
Vocal duet albums
United Artists Records albums
Covers albums
Albums arranged by Bill Justis
Albums produced by Larry Butler (producer)